Vettakollen is a station on the Holmenkollen Line (line 1) of the Oslo Metro. It is located between Skådalen and Gulleråsen. The station was opened on 31 May 1898 as part of the light rail to Holmenkollen. The station was originally opened as Greveveien, but changed its name a few months after the opening.

References

Oslo Metro stations in Oslo
Railway stations opened in 1898
1898 establishments in Norway